Chauncey Bundy Little (February 10, 1877 – September 29, 1952) was a U.S. Representative from Kansas.

Born in Olathe, Kansas, Little attended grade school and high school in Olathe and the Kansas State College at Manhattan. In 1898, he graduated from the law department of the University of Kansas at Lawrence. He was admitted to the bar the same year and commenced practice in Olathe. He was the city attorney of Olathe from 1901–06, and served as the county attorney of Johnson County, Kansas from 1909 to 1913.

Little was elected as a Democrat to the Sixty-ninth Congress (March 4, 1925 – March 3, 1927). He was an unsuccessful candidate for re-election in 1926 to the Seventieth Congress. He resumed the practice of law. He was an unsuccessful candidate for Governor of Kansas in 1928. He died in Olathe, Kansas on September 29, 1952, and was interred in Olathe Cemetery.

References

1877 births
1952 deaths
Democratic Party members of the United States House of Representatives from Kansas
Kansas State University alumni
University of Kansas School of Law alumni
Politicians from Olathe, Kansas